William Sumner Maynard (April 25, 1802 – June 18, 1866) was a politician from the U.S. state of Michigan, who served as mayor of Ann Arbor, Michigan from 1856 to 1858 and again from 1865 to 1866. Maynard was born in Berkshire County, Massachusetts. He suffered from severe depression and (while still Mayor) committed suicide in 1866 by an overdose of laudanum. Long notes of explanation were found in the pockets of his dressing gown, detailing Maynard's struggles with "The Evil One" (a synonym for Satan). The notes were published verbatim in Ann Arbor's several weekly newspapers. Maynard had been Ann Arbor's biggest land developer, a member and organizer in 1836 of the Ann Arbor Land Company, which acquired the former Henry Rumsey farm east of town, conveying 40 acres thereof to the newly formed State of Michigan as the site of the future University of Michigan, while hoping to profit by subdividing and selling town lots adjacent to the campus. Maynard also developed much of the land west of Ann Arbor's Main Street, as far west as the present Seventh Street. His own landmark dwelling was on the northwest corner of Main and William Street, and the estate stretched west to the present Ashley street, and halfway up the block to Liberty. For many years he owned a grocery, drug and dry-goods store and was said to be the wealthiest man in Ann Arbor at the time of his suicide. His grave is in Forest Hill Cemetery in Ann Arbor.

Maynard's first wife was Julia Guiteau (d. 1856), whose nephew, Charles Julius Guiteau, assassinated President James Garfield on July 2, 1881. For a short while in 1859 Charles Guiteau lived with his uncle in Ann Arbor, while trying to gain admission to the University of Michigan.

External links 
 
 Mayors of Ann Arbor page at PoliticalGraveyard.com

1802 births
1866 deaths
Mayors of Ann Arbor, Michigan
American politicians who committed suicide
Drug-related suicides in Michigan
American Congregationalists
19th-century American politicians
University of Michigan campus
Politicians from Ann Arbor, Michigan
1860s suicides